Aimé-Joseph de Fleuriau (1870 - 1938) was a French diplomat who served as Ambassador to London from 1924 until 1933.

Honours 
  - Grand officier, Légion d'Honneur
  - Hon. GCB
  - Hon. GCVO

References

External links 
 www.ambafrance-uk.org

1870 births
1938 deaths
University of Paris alumni
20th-century French diplomats
Ambassadors of France to the United Kingdom
Grand Officiers of the Légion d'honneur
Honorary Knights Grand Cross of the Order of the Bath
Honorary Knights Grand Cross of the Royal Victorian Order
French noble families